This is a list of rugby league footballers who have played for Fulham, London Crusaders, London Broncos, and Harlequins RL. Players are listed according to their heritage number as allocated by the London Broncos Supporter's Association (LBSA) in the "London Roll of Honour", and separated by the season in which they made their début. "Hall of Fame members" are listed in bold.

Player List

Fulham 1980-81

Fulham 1981-82

Fulham 1982-83

Fulham 1983-84

Fulham 1984-85

Fulham 1985-86

Fulham 1986-87

Fulham 1987-88

Fulham 1988-89

Fulham 1989-90

Fulham 1990-91

London Crusaders 1991-92

London Crusaders 1992-93

London Crusaders 1993-94

London Broncos 1994-95

London Broncos 1995-96

London Broncos 1996

London Broncos 1997

London Broncos 1998

London Broncos 1999

London Broncos 2000

London Broncos 2001

London Broncos 2002

London Broncos 2003

London Broncos 2004

London Broncos 2005

Quins RL 2006

Quins RL 2007

Quins RL 2008

Quins RL 2009

Quins RL 2010

Quins RL 2011

London Broncos 2012

London Broncos 2013

London Broncos 2014

London Broncos 2015

London Broncos 2016

London Broncos 2017

London Broncos 2018

London Broncos 2019

London Broncos 2020

London Broncos 2021

London Broncos 2022

London Broncos 2023

References

 
London Broncos players
Broncos